Brampton Bierlow, often known as Brampton, is a village and civil parish in the Metropolitan Borough of Rotherham, South Yorkshire, England. It is situated on the south side of the Dearne Valley, between Barnsley and Rotherham.

According to the 2001 census, the parish had a population of 3,658, increasing to 4,610 at the 2011 Census.  The parish was within the historic county boundaries of the West Riding of Yorkshire.

Brampton Bierlow is a former mining village, with employment primarily related to the coal industry; the economy declined after the closure of mines in the 1980s, which was, in part, sparked by the announcement of the closure of Cortonwood Colliery in the village. Despite some economic recovery, Brampton was, at one point, declared one of the poorest areas in the European Union (before the 2004 expansion).

Recently, the economy of the area has improved, as investment has been put into infrastructure and developing light industry and service industries in the area.

Steve Rothery, guitarist of the band Marillion, was born in Brampton. Footballers George Robledo and Ted Robledo, both of whom played football for Newcastle United, grew up in the village: they were born in Chile but moved to Brampton (their mother's home) as children (in 1932) because of the instability in Chile at the time. George represented Chile at the 1950 FIFA World Cup.

See also 
Listed buildings in Brampton Bierlow
Listed buildings in Rotherham (Hoober Ward)
:Category:People from Brampton Bierlow

References

External links

Villages in South Yorkshire
Geography of the Metropolitan Borough of Rotherham
Civil parishes in South Yorkshire